Lupu is a surname of Romanian origin, derived from the Romanian word lup ("wolf"), from Latin lupus ("wolf"). Its Italian equivalent is Lupo, its French equivalent is Loup, its Spanish equivalent is López, and its Portuguese equivalent is Lopes or Lopo.

The name may refer to:
 Ştefăniţă Lupu (1641–1661), Moldavian Voivode between 1659 and 1661

 Dan Lupu (born 1983), Romanian actor
 Dănuţ Lupu (b. 1967), Romanian football midfielder
 Ion Lupu, Moldovan politician, former parliamentarian, member of the Alliance for European Integration and former Minister of Youth and Sports
 Marian Lupu (born 1966), Moldovan politician
 Mikaela Lupu (born 1995), Moldovan-born Portuguese actress 
 Nataliia Lupu (born 1987), Ukrainian athlete of Romanian descent
 Nicolae Gh. Lupu (1884–1966), Romanian physician
 Nicolae L. Lupu (1876–1947), Romanian politician and medical doctor
 Petrache Lupu (1907-1994), shepherd from Maglavit commune
 Radu Lupu (1945–2022), Romanian concert pianist
 Robert Lupu (born 1982), Romanian futsal player 
 Sabin Dănuț Lupu (born 1993), Romanian professional footballer 
 Vasile Lupu (1595–1661), Moldavian Voivode between 1634 and 1653
 Valeriu Lupu (born 1991), Romanian footballer

Romanian-language surnames